Basanasca is a genus of moths belonging to the family Tineidae. It contains only one species, Basanasca parcens, which is found in Brazil.

References

Tineidae
Monotypic moth genera
Moths of South America
Tineidae genera
Taxa named by Edward Meyrick